Utricularia smithiana is a medium-sized, probably perennial carnivorous plant that belongs to the genus Utricularia. It is endemic to India. U. smithiana grows as a terrestrial or affixed subaquatic plant in swamps or shallow water pools at medium and high altitudes. It was originally described by Robert Wight in 1849, reduced to a variety of U. caerulea by Charles Baron Clarke in 1884, and later reinstated as U. smithiana.

See also 
 List of Utricularia species

References 

Carnivorous plants of Asia
Flora of India (region)
smithiana